The Count of Monte Cristo (French: Le comte de Monte Cristo) is a 1943 French-Italian film  directed by Robert Vernay with Ferruccio Cerio as the supervising director. Based on the classic 1844 novel Le Comte de Monte Cristo by Alexandre Dumas père, this two-part film stars Pierre Richard-Willm in the title role.

It was shot at the Cinecittà Studios in Rome. The film's sets were designed by the art director René Renoux.

Plot

Edmond Dantès, first mate of a merchant ship returning from the Orient, having taken command of his ship after the death of the captain, docks at Elba to deliver a letter to Napoleon. As a result of this imprudence, committed to respect the will of his predecessor, he falls victim to a plot hatched by the sailor Caderousse, by the officer Fernand Mondego (later Count de Morcerf), in love with Mercédès, Dantès's fiancée, and by the magistrate Gérard de Villefort (who fears to be compromised by the ultra-Bonapartist activities of his father, General Noirtier). Dantes is then taken in secret to the depths of a castle off the coast of Marseille…

Cast
 Pierre Richard-Willm as Edmond Dantès
 Michèle Alfa as Mercédès
 Aimé Clariond as Monsieur de Villefort
 Marcel Herrand as Bertuccio
 Ermete Zacconi as L'abbé Faria
 Alexandre Rignault as Caderousse
 Henri Bosc as Fernand, le comte de Morcerf
 Jacques Baumer as Noirtier
 André Fouché as Benedetto
 René Bergeron as Le policier
 Marie-Hélène Dasté as Madame de Villefort
 Yves Deniaud as Pénélan
 Fred Pasquali as Joannès
 Jean Joffre as Dantès père
 Paul Faivre as Brissard
 Georges Colin as Le juge d'instruction
 Line Noro as La Carconte
 Charles Granval as Monsieur Morel

External links
 
 
 The Count of Monte Cristo at Variety Distribution

1943 films
French black-and-white films
Films based on The Count of Monte Cristo
Films shot in Italy
1940s French-language films
1940s Italian-language films
Italian black-and-white films
Films released in separate parts
1940s adventure drama films
French adventure drama films
Italian adventure drama films
1943 drama films
Films shot at Cinecittà Studios
1940s multilingual films
French multilingual films
Italian multilingual films
1940s French films
1940s Italian films
French-language Italian films